Kristijan Živković (born 21 February 1999) is a Serbian footballer who plays for Radnički Niš.

Club career

Vojvodina
Born in Požarevac, Živković came through the Vojvodina youth academy. He appeared with the club on "Future Talents Cup", and the "Tournament of Friendship" in 2015, being one of the most effective players. He was also elected for the best player of the tournament "Brodarac 2016".

On 28 June 2017, Živković signed his first professional contract, penning a four-year deal with the club. Passing the complete pre-season with the first team, Živković made his official debut for the club in 2–0 away loss to MFK Ružomberok in second leg of the first qualifying round for 2017–18 UEFA Europa League. He also made his Serbian SuperLiga debut on 21 July 2017, in 1–0 home win against Čukarički.

International career
At the beginning of 2017, Živković had been invited in selective camp for Serbian under-18 national level under coach Miloš Velebit. Živković made his debut for the team replacing Jug Stanojev in a match against Uzbekistan on 18 April 2017. He scored his first goal for the team in 3–0 victory against France on 3 June 2017.

Career statistics

References

External links
 
 
 
 

1999 births
Living people
Sportspeople from Požarevac
Association football wingers
Serbian footballers
FK Vojvodina players
Serbian SuperLiga players